Keith Fair (born January 8, 1968) is a Canadian-born Swiss former professional ice hockey left winger.

Born in Castlegar, British Columbia, Fair played his entire professional career in Switzerland, playing in the National League A for HC Ambrì-Piotta and HC Lugano and in the National League B for EHC Chur.

Fair has participated as a member of the Swiss national team at the 1992 Winter Olympics and the 1992 IIHF World Championships.

References

External links

1968 births
Living people
Canadian expatriate ice hockey players in Switzerland
ECH Chur players
HC Ambrì-Piotta players
HC Lugano players
Ice hockey people from British Columbia
Ice hockey players at the 1992 Winter Olympics
Langley Eagles players
Olympic ice hockey players of Switzerland
Sidney Capitals players
Sportspeople from Castlegar, British Columbia
Swiss ice hockey left wingers
Naturalised citizens of Switzerland